Chinmaya Vishwavidyapeeth is a deemed to be University, in the 'de novo' category approved by University Grants Commission. Chinmaya Vishwavidyapeeth started in 2016 with a purview of promoting Indian Knowledge System, Sanskrit and Indic Traditions, 2016 was chosen as it is the centenary year of founder of Chinmaya Mission, Swami Chinmayananda. The headquarters of the university are situated at the maternal home of Adi Shankara at Veliyanad, (near Piravom) Ernakulam District, Kerala, India.

History
For nearly seven decades, Chinmaya Mission has been transforming lives with its motto of 'Giving Maximum Happiness to Maximum People for Maximum Time'. In doing so, one of its core thrust areas has been education.

Building on over fifty years of running more than a hundred Chinmaya Vidyalayas – prestigious primary and secondary schools and colleges – across the country, the Chinmaya vision for education redrew its horizon in 2017 with the launch of Chinmaya Vishwa Vidyapeeth (CVV), a university with a difference. One that believes the objective of education is to create good human beings who can fulfil personal goals while serving society.

Founded on the principles of Purity, Spirituality, Practicality and Innovation, CVV's core mission is to blend the ancient and time-tested wisdom of India with present-day knowledge fields. It is breaking new ground where necessary and adopting the merits of all that has come before but always leaning towards the winds of innovation. Striking a careful balance between the old and new, the university offers common streams of courses with unique electives and supplementary subjects, with the intent to mould the teenagers of today into well-rounded, responsible, value-grounded, young adults that contribute to the nation, and the world at large.

As a Liberal University for Sanskrit and Indic Traditions, Chinmaya Vishwa Vidyapeeth was started in 2016 under the leadership of Professor B. Mahadevan as he was the acting Vice-Chancellor then. University had a vision of promoting the Indian Knowledge System and Indian Knowledge Tradition by blending them with modern sciences. It was ought to become a bridge between the east and the west. Conferences like National Frontier for Sanskrit and Indian Tradition and Oneness Conference did establish a new frontier for researchers and investigators like Raj Vedam, and Vishwa Adluri who have presented their interdisciplinary papers and presentations. Most of the academic conferences at Chinmaya Vishwavidyapeeth had been followed up with proceeding publications which in turn has led many international scholars to come and visit the Liberal University.

The initial days of the university were filled with many initiatives by different schools and clubs for matching the research and academic rigour of the west. Academic insight in Indian Knowledge Traditions, Research Methodologies, Avadhānam, Debate, Social Entrepreneurship, and Virtual Reality were focused. The promise of academic investigation and the permanent study of Dharma is the driving impetus of the university. The role model Adi Shankaracharya is considered as the scintillating ideal along whose line the students are taught to observe, think, learn, debate, and imbibe the many facets in the inter-disciplinary subjects of study. Celebration of Adi Shankara Jayati is done yearly and scholars are invited to peruse this vision of the university.

Since then, Chinmaya Vishwavidyapeeth has expanded its scope to cater to students in M.Sc., PhD, B.Sc. B.Ed., Vocational, Management, Vyakarana, and Vedanta. Chinmaya Vishwavidyapeeth is the Indian Gurukula which brings forth the reservoir of Indian Knowledge System, Contemporary Knowledge System, Indian Knowledge Tradition, Cultural Studies, Applied Psychology, Management and Research. It started way before National Education Policy of India 2020 came, hence it has always been the front runner to the idea of Naya Bharat under National Education Policy of India 2020. High quality liberal education and liberal sciences were the pre-focused areas of the Chinmaya Vishwavidyapeeth. Thus, the call was to set up India's own Harvard University.

Teaching and learning 

Teaching at Chinmaya Vishwavidyapeeth always revolves around the schools. School of Vedic Knowledge Systems, School of Philosophy, Psychology and Scientific Heritage, Contemporary Knowledge Systems, Ethics, Governance, Culture and Social Systems, School of Linguistics and Literary Studies, and School of Kalayoga. The academic initiative in Vedic Knowledge System revolves around interdisciplinary study and cross-institution research in Indian Knowledge System. Shastra studies, Vyakyartha studies, and their school-of-vedic-knowledge-systems liberal modern applications are focused on.

Campuses 
Chinmaya Vishwa Vidyapeeth (CVV) functions from two campuses: the Chinmaya Eswar Gurukula campus in Kochi, Kerala, and the Chinmaya Naada Bindu Gurukula campus in Kolwan, near Pune. It also has a facility at Warriam road in Kochi city.

Chinmaya Eswar Gurukula (CEG)
Housed in the maternal birth home of Sri Adi Sankaracharya, is the Chinmaya Eswar Gurukula (CEG) campus. Every classroom at CVV is digitally equipped and has Wi-Fi access.

The CEG campus is situated at a distance of 47 km from Kochi International Airport and 28 km from Ernakulam South Railway station. Public buses, cabs and auto-rickshaws are available for the students to travel to Ernakulam. Train connections to Mumbai, Goa, Bengaluru, Chennai and other cities of India are plentiful.

Chinmaya Naada Bindu Gurukula (CNBG)
Nestled at the foothills of the majestic Sahyadri mountain range, the Chinmaya Naada Bindu Gurukula (CNBG) campus offers students the unique opportunity of learning in the traditional gurukula environment while working towards a university degree in their chosen field of performing arts.

The campus offers programmes that are a result of the synergy between Music, Sanskrit and ancient Indian Knowledge Traditions. The entire pedagogy is anchored in the guru-shishya parampara, providing ample opportunities for students to gain in-depth knowledge and experience through meaningful discussions, demonstrations and performances.

The CNBG campus is located at a distance of around 50 km from Pune Airport and 45 km from Pune Railway station. Pune is well connected, via the national and state highways, to its neighbouring cities.

Upcoming Campus for Global Excellence

CVV is currently building a new campus on over 50 acres of land in Onakkoor, Kerala. This new learning environment will have infrastructure and environmentally friendly features such as a  solar-powered farm,  biogas, solid waste treatment and the latest cooling techniques. Other highlights include a Kalayoga Centre to support the study of classical Indian music and dance and a  Meditation  Centre for students to refresh emotionally and rejuvenate spiritually.

Campus

Student Government 

The student government represents the absent official student body which is promised in the Chinmaya Vishwavidyapeeth's student club policy. Due to the paucity of student elections, the student government is missing since 2017. However, few societies have the university's recognition as the life-at-cvv official club. The prominent ones are Creative and Debating Society which was founded to promote debate with the spirit of Shri Adi Shankara, Grantha Club which promotes book reading and other literary endeavours, and Bharata Society which does informal dancing now and then.

Few key achievements that clubs had were mostly from Creative and Debating Society:
 Founding provost of CADS got to publish his poetry at the national journal of Chaukhamba Pustakalay's journal hosted by Association of Indian Philosopher. 
United Nations 75 Debate hosted by  Albertian Foundation was won by the debaters of Creative and Debating Society.  They got the opportunity to pitch in front of the provost of United Nation Office of Drugs and Crime.
 ex CADer KG Aditya Anshuman won the international essay writing competition.

References

Education in Kochi
Educational institutions with year of establishment missing